Arraute-Charritte is a commune in the Pyrénées-Atlantiques department in the Nouvelle-Aquitaine region of south-western France.

The inhabitants of the commune are known as Arruetar.

Geography
Arraute-Charritte is located in the former province of Lower Navarre some 40 km east by south-east of Bayonne and 15 km north-west of Saint-Palais. Access to the commune is by the D11 road from Bidache in the north passing through the commune east of the village and continuing to Masparraute in the south. Access to the village is by the D246 from Orègue in the west passing the village then south-west to Masparraute. The D313 also passes down the western border of the commune from the D11 south of Bidache and joins the D246 west of the village. The D310 goes east from the D11 north of the village to Bergouey-Viellenave. There are forests in the north-east and north-west of the commune with a band of patchy forest through the centre. The rest of the commune is farmland.

There is a stop in the commune on bus route 870 from Tardets-Sorholus to Bayonne on the Interurban Network of Pyrénées-Atlantiques.

The Bidouze river forms the north-eastern border of the commune with the Ruisseau de Mandeheguy flowing into it there. Numerous other streams rise all over the commune and flow east to the Bidouze. The Ruiusseau de Bordaberry rises in the north of the commune and flows west to join the Apatharena which forms the western border of the commune and continues north to join the Lihoury. Numerous other streams rise in the commune and flow to the Apatharena.

Places and Hamlets

 Ameztoya
 Ansobieta
 Aphatepe
 Aphatiague
 Arraute
 Ascoundreguy
 Atchuquia
 Ayenia
 Baratchartia
 Barneto
 Beigtanborda
 Bellevue
 Bellereta
 Bentaberry
 Bertranteguia
 Biscaborda
 Biscagoitia
 Biscaya
 Bissargorry
 Bordaberry
 Bordakoborda
 Bousquets
 Camoussarria
 Charritte
 Charrittounia
 Chilocoa
 Costenenia
 Elhordoy
 Elizondokoborda
 Ermit
 Ermitaborda
 Etchari
 Etchebestia
 Etchemendikoborda
 Etchemendy
 Ithurrongarat
 Fitounia
 Galharreta
 Garatia
 Garaya
 Goihenech
 Grachigno
 Harria
 Héguia
 Iratchet
 Iriatia
 Iribarnia
 Jauregia
 Labenta
 Larralde-Borda
 Borde Larralde
 Larraldia (two places)
 Laxague (ruins)
 Mandio
 Mendiburia
 Manéchans (ruins)
 Millafranque
 Miquelet
 Olheguy
 Oquelargainia
 Othaburia
 Oxobia
 Oyhanburia
 Oyhenart
 Oyhenartia
 Patatouch
 Phagoa
 Borde dou Rey
 Saharcet
 Santacoits
 Sarrailh
 Sorhigarat
 Sorhigaratborda
 Souquirats
 Trouilh
 Urrutia

Toponymy
The commune name in basque is Arrueta-Sarrikota.

Jean-Baptiste Orpustan indicated that Charrite came from Sarri-ko-(e)ta meaning "place of small bushes". However, there is no certainty of the origin of the name Arraute.

The following table details the origins of the commune name and other names in the commune.

Sources:
Raymond: Topographic Dictionary of the Department of Basses-Pyrenees, 1863, on the page numbers indicated in the table. 
Orpustan: Jean-Baptiste Orpustan,   New Basque Toponymy
Cassini: Cassini Map from 1750
Ldh/EHESS/Cassini: 

Origins:
Duchesne: Duchesne collection volume CXIV
Pamplona: Titles of Pamplona
Biscay: Martin Biscay

History
The commune of Arraute and its village, Charritte-Mixe, were merged on 27 June 1842.

Heraldry

Administration

List of Successive Mayors

Inter-communality
The commune is part of six inter-communal structures:
 the Communauté d'agglomération du Pays Basque
 the AEP association of Pays de Mixe;
 the educational regrouping association of Amorots-Succos, Arraute-Charritte, Beguios, Masparraute, and Orègue;
 the Energy association of Pyrénées-Atlantiques;
 the inter-communal association for the functioning of schools in Amikuze;
 the association to support Basque culture.

Demography
In 2017 the commune had 385 inhabitants. The population data given in the table and graph below include the former commune of Charritte, absorbed in 1842.

Distribution of Age Groups
Percentage Distribution of Age Groups in Arraute-Charritte and Pyrénées-Atlantiques Department in 2017

Source: INSEE

Economy
The town is part of the Appellation d'origine contrôlée (AOC) zone designation of Ossau-iraty.

Budget and Taxation
Dwelling Tax: 9.04% (2003)
Property tax: 6.39% (built properties)
Business Tax: 7.97%

The local economy is mainly based on agriculture:
Agriculture: cereals (wheat, barley, corn);
Viticulture;
Livestock: cattle, sheep, pigs, geese, and ducks (foie gras);
Forestry (oak);
Heliciculture (snail farming).

Culture and Heritage

Civil heritage
The village is typically Basque and has some Maisons à colombages (timbered houses).

Religious heritage

The Parish Church of Saint-Pierre in Arraute (19th century) is registered as an historical monument.
The Funeral Chapel of Samacoitz is also part of the religious heritage.

Environmental heritage
The Banks of the Bidouze are classified as a Natura 2000 site.

Education
Amorots-Succos, Masparraute, Orègue, Béguios, and Arraute-Charritte have created together an inter-communal educational grouping (R.P.I. AMOBA).

See also
Communes of the Pyrénées-Atlantiques department

References

External links
Arraute-Charritte on Géoportail, National Geographic Institute (IGN) website 
Arraute and Charritte on the 1750 Cassini Map

Communes of Pyrénées-Atlantiques
Lower Navarre